Alicudi is the westernmost of the seven islands that make up the Aeolian archipelago, a volcanic island chain north of Sicily.

History
The island was formed by the long-extinct Montagnola volcano, roughly 150,000 years ago. It has been suggested that the last evolutive act of the island took place only 27,000 years ago.

The island was first populated as long ago as 17th century BC, as some archaeological evidence from this period has been found. Roman ceramic fragments, dating from many centuries later, can be found on the eastern coast of the island.

The modern name of "Alicudi" is descended from the island's Ancient Greek name of  Ereikousa, derived from Erica (heather) growing on the island’s slopes.  For many centuries, Alicudi was the target of frequent incursions by pirates. Consequently, the island’s population was forced to find shelter in small houses constructed on high terraces and also meant that simple agriculture and cultivation of the peach were the foundations of the modest island economy.

In more recent times, the island became known for its alleged witches and sorcerers whose explanation has come to be attributed to ergotism in local grain-based foodstuff which, due to scarcity, was consumed regardless of the fungi infection.

Demography
Today there are around 120 inhabitants who mostly live off fishing, or the small agriculture of the island. There is only one restaurant on the island and the menu depends greatly on what fish the local fishermen have caught, or what food supplies the hydrofoil brings.

See also
List of volcanoes in Italy

Notes and references

External links
About Alicudi 
Aeolian Island tourism website 
Topographic Map of the Island
Alicudi web 
BBC Travel - Alicudi: Italy's LSD island

Frazioni of the Metropolitan City of Messina
Stratovolcanoes of Italy
Aeolian Islands
Pleistocene stratovolcanoes